Dagadapally (or chinna dagada) (Telugu: Telugu) is a village in Veepangandla mandal in Wanaparthy district of Telangana State, India.

Villages in Wanaparthy district